Emily Erin Deschanel (born October 11, 1976) is an American actress. She portrayed Dr. Temperance "Bones" Brennan in the Fox crime procedural series Bones (2005–2017).

Early life and education
Deschanel was born in Los Angeles, California, to cinematographer and director Caleb Deschanel and actress Mary Jo Deschanel (née Weir). Her younger sister is an actress and singer-songwriter Zooey Deschanel. Her paternal grandfather was French, from Oullins, Rhône; her roots also include Swiss, Dutch, English, Irish, and other French ancestry.

Deschanel attended Harvard-Westlake School and Crossroads School in Los Angeles.

Career

In 1994, Deschanel made her feature film debut in the romantic comedy-drama It Could Happen to You, on which her father worked as chief cinematographer. Her next notable role was as Pam Asbury in Stephen King's horror miniseries Rose Red in 2002. Then she appeared in Cold Mountain, The Alamo, and Glory Road and was named one of "six actresses to watch" by Interview Magazine in 2004.

In 2005, Deschanel was cast as Dr. Temperance Brennan with David Boreanaz as FBI agent Seeley Booth on the Fox crime procedural comedy-drama Bones, based on the novels and the career of forensic anthropologist and author Kathy Reichs, created by Hart Hanson. The series ran for 12 seasons from September 13, 2005, to March 28, 2017. For her performance, she received a 2006 Satellite Award nomination and a 2007 Teen Choice Award nomination. Deschanel and Boreanaz served as co-producers at the start of the show's third season, before becoming producers in the middle of the show's fourth season. While Bones was still in production, Deschanel also played the Brennan character on a 2015 episode of Sleepy Hollow and a 2016 episode of BoJack Horseman.

Deschanel, with Alyson Hannigan, Jaime King, Minka Kelly, and Katharine McPhee made a video slumber party featured on FunnyorDie.com to promote regular breast cancer screenings for the organization Stand Up 2 Cancer. In recent years, her passion for animal welfare has led her to providing the narration for My Child Is a Monkey and serving as an associate producer on the documentary film How I Became an Elephant. Deschanel ranked number 72 in The 2012 Hot 100 on AfterEllen.

Deschanel starred in the 2022 Netflix miniseries Devil in Ohio.

Personal life
Deschanel is a vegan and a supporter of animal rights causes. She has said she went vegan after watching the film Diet for a New America. She can be seen in an Access Hollywood video at the book launch event of Karen Dawn's Thanking the Monkey: Rethinking the Way We Treat Animals, discussing how vegetarian and vegan diets help the environment, and a video on the homepage of the book's website talking about the importance of animal rights. She collaborated with PETA on a video encouraging mothers to raise their children as vegans. In September 2014, she joined the board of directors at Farm Sanctuary.

Deschanel was raised Roman Catholic but is no longer practicing and has expressed agnostic views, saying "I am more of a spiritual person, if anything, and I am of the belief that we don't know, and I'm not going to pretend that I do."

On September 25, 2010, Deschanel married It's Always Sunny in Philadelphia actor and writer David Hornsby in a small private ceremony in the Pacific Palisades area of Los Angeles. On September 21, 2011, Deschanel gave birth to their first son. On June 8, 2015, she gave birth to their second son. Both pregnancies were written into Bones.

Deschanel is best friends with her Bones co-star Michaela Conlin, who played her best friend Angela Montenegro on the show. She is also friends and has a strong working relationship with her Bones co-star David Boreanaz.

In 2015, Deschanel filed suit against Fox alongside Boreanaz, Reichs and Bones executive producer Barry Josephson, claiming they were cheated out of their share of series profits. In February 2019, an arbitrator awarded them $179 million: $128 million in punitive damages, $32 million in compensatory damages, $10 million in prejudgment interest and more than $9 million in fees and costs. In May 2019, the Los Angeles Superior Court voided the punitive damages, with the plaintiffs' attorneys saying they would appeal. In September 2019, the parties came to an undisclosed settlement.

Filmography

Film

Television

Awards and nominations

References

External links
 
 
 

1976 births
Living people
20th-century American actresses
21st-century American actresses
Actresses from Los Angeles
American agnostics
American film actresses
American people of Dutch descent
American people of English descent
American people of French descent
American people of Irish descent
American people of Swiss descent
American television actresses
American veganism activists
American women television producers
Boston University College of Fine Arts alumni
Crossroads School alumni
Former Roman Catholics
Harvard-Westlake School alumni
Television producers from California